Wyre Forest is a local government district in Worcestershire, England, covering the towns of Kidderminster, Stourport-on-Severn and Bewdley, and several civil parishes and their villages. Its council was previously based in Stourport-on-Severn, but moved to new purpose built offices on the outskirts of Kidderminster in 2012.

The district was formed under the Local Government Act 1972, on 1 April 1974, as a merger of Bewdley and Kidderminster municipal boroughs, Stourport-on-Severn Urban District Council and Kidderminster Rural District Council.

Since 2011, Wyre Forest has formed part of the Greater Birmingham & Solihull Local Enterprise Partnership along with neighbouring authorities Birmingham, Bromsgrove, Cannock Chase, East Staffordshire, Lichfield, Redditch, Solihull and Tamworth.

In Wyre Forest, the population size has increased by 3.7%, from around 98,000 in 2011 to 101,600 in 2021.

Governance

The Wyre Forest parliamentary constituency, which covers most of the district, is represented by the Conservative MP Mark Garnier. He has held the seat since the 2010 general election, when he gained it from Richard Taylor of Health Concern, who had held the seat from 2001 to 2010.

Elections to Wyre Forest District Council are held in three out of every four years, with one third of the seats on the council being elected at each election. Since the first election to the council in 1973 no party has held a majority on the council for most of the time, while the Conservatives, Labour and Health Concern have had periods in control. The Conservatives regained a majority at the  last election in 2015. 

In 2019, the Conservatives lost 7 seats, while there were gains for ICHC, Independent and the Greens. Labour also lost one seat. The council is now run by an Independent-Liberal Democrat-ICHC coalition with the support of the single Green Party councillor.

Staff 
Many of the council's staff are based at Wyre Forest House. The chief executive is Ian Miller.

Wards 
The council is composed of 33 councillors, in 12 electoral wards of Wyre Forest.

 Aggborough & Spennells
 Areley Kings & Riverside
 Bewdley & Rock
 Blakebrook & Habberley South
 Broadwaters
 Foley Park & Hoobrook
 Franche & Habberley North
 Lickhill
 Mitton
 Offmore & Comberton
 Wribbenhall & Arley
 Wyre Forest Rural

Political make-up 

Since 2019, elections are for the full council, with councillor having 4 year terms. The Progressive Alliance, a political grouping which includes Health Concern, Independent and the Green Party has minority control of the council after Liberal Democrats resigned from the group in 2021. Until then, the Progressive Alliance had a majority control.

The council is controlled by the Progressive Alliance and led by independent councillor Helen Dyke.

Parishes 
Areley Kings
Bewdley
Broome
Chaddesley Corbett
Churchill and Blakedown
Kidderminster
Kidderminster Foreign
Ribbesford
Rock
Rushock
Stone
Stourport-on-Severn
Upper Arley
Wilden
Wolverley and Cookley

Schools 

There are five secondary schools within the district.

Baxter College
The Bewdley School
Wolverley C E Secondary School
The Stourport High School & VIth Form Centre
King Charles I School

Media 
The Shuttle

See also 
Wyre Forest District Council elections

References

External links
 Official District Council web site.

 
Non-metropolitan districts of Worcestershire